Mini pops, Minipops or similar may refer to:

 Minipops, an early-1980s British television series
 Korg Mini Pops, an early drum machine range from the late 1960s and the 1970s
 Minny Pops, an Amsterdam-based new wave/electronic/art punk band active from the late-1970s to the mid-1980s
 Mini Pop Kids, a Canadian music line by K-tel
 "minipops 67 (120.2)", a song by Aphex Twin